Jean Pierre Targete is a fantasy and science fiction artist.

Career
He created the cover art for many of the Avon paperback editions of The Chronicles of Amber and for the Second Foundation Trilogy.

Targete illustrated the cards Claw-Hide, Doppel Shock, and Myzary for the 1995 Fleer Ultra Spider-Man set.

Personal life
He was born in New York City and raised in Miami, Florida. He currently works and lives in Winnetka, California.

References

External links 
Jean Pierre Targete's official website

American speculative fiction artists
Fantasy artists
Living people
Role-playing game artists
Science fiction artists
Year of birth missing (living people)